Nahirat (also Romanized as Nahīrāt) is a village in Neysan Rural District, Neysan District, Hoveyzeh County, Khuzestan Province, Iran. At the 2006 census, its population was 102, in 12 families.

References 

Populated places in Hoveyzeh County